José António Duro (22 October 1875 – 18 January 1899) was a Portuguese poet. He was born in Portalegre and attended college in Lisbon. His only work published during his lifetime was Fel.

References 

1875 births
1899 deaths
19th-century Portuguese writers
19th-century male writers
People from Portalegre, Portugal
19th-century deaths from tuberculosis
19th-century poets
Tuberculosis deaths in Portugal